The Houston Fire Museum, also known as the Fire Museum of Houston, is located in the Midtown District of Houston, Texas. The museum contains interactive exhibits and displays featuring antique and modern firefighting paraphernalia.  The museum also educates its visitors in fire safety and prevention and is considered to be one of the finest centers of its kind in Texas.  The museum's building, which was originally home to the Houston Fire Department's Fire Station No. 7, is listed on the National Register of Historic Places and is a Recorded Texas Historic Landmark.

Building history 
The building which currently houses the Houston Fire Museum was originally Fire Station No. 7, Houston's oldest fire house. Designed in the Romanesque style by Olle J. Lorehn, the two-story brick building was completed in January 1899 and features rusticated stone details, a five bay front with Central arched entry flanked by two apparatus bay entries and unique parapet details.  It was updated in the 1920s to accommodate motorized vehicles. Used as a fire station until 1968, the building sat empty after Fire Station No. 7 was relocated until its complete restoration in 1981 in preparation for the opening of the museum.

Exhibits and collection 
The museum's exhibits highlight the evolution of firefighting technology as well as local fire service history and features interactive elements including a fire pole which visitors can slide down and a fire engine cab. The collection comprises both antique and modern firefighter uniforms, uniform emblems, and equipment; historic fire marks; and photographs from local and national fire service events including the 1947 Texas City disaster. The collection also features firefighting vehicles such as a hand-drawn and hand-powered pumper, a horse-drawn steam engine, and a 1912 American Automatic ware tower with an American LaFrance engine, the only vehicle of its type ever used by the HFD.

New museum 
According to the Houston Fire Museum's official website, the construction of a new fire museum is currently in the planning stages. This new museum will be modeled after the old Central Fire Station and will emphasize fire safety and prevention education over firefighting history.

References

External links 
 Official site

Museums in Houston
National Register of Historic Places in Houston
Recorded Texas Historic Landmarks
Firefighting museums in the United States
Firefighting in Texas